Ladislaus Farkas (Hungarian: Farkas László, Hebrew: לדיסלאוס פרקש) (May 10, 1904, in Dunajská Streda, Austria-Hungary – December 31, 1948, in Monte Argentario, Italy) is an Israeli chemist, of Austro-Hungarian origin, was the founder of the Department of Physical Chemistry at the Hebrew University of Jerusalem.

Education and career 
Farkas was born in Dunajská Streda, Slovakia as the son of a pharmacist. In 1908, the family moved to Nagyvárad in Transylvania (today Oradea in Romania), where his father ran a pharmacy. The family attends a synagogue affiliated with Neolog Judaism. Farkas studied at the Gymnasium in Oradea, then spent two years at the Technical University of Vienna. He continued his studies in Berlin where he entered the Kaiser Wilhelm Institute of Chemistry in 1924. His thesis supervisor was Karl Friedrich Bonhoeffer, with whom he established strong friendships. He obtained his doctorate in 1928 and was appointed personal assistant to the German chemist Fritz Haber that same year.

Pursuant to the German law on the restoration of the civil service of April 7, 1933, aimed at dismissing Jewish civil servants, Farkas was dismissed by the director of the chemical institute, Fritz Haber on April 29, 1933. of Jewish origin, sends his own letter of resignation the following day. Farkas then benefited from the financial support of Haber who helped his Jewish collaborators affected by the law to settle abroad.

In 1935, he made Aliyah to Palestine and in 1936 founded a department of physical chemistry at the Hebrew University of Jerusalem which he directed until his death. During World War II, the group, led by Farkas, contributed to the British war effort. Farkas was secretary of the scientific advisory committee of the War Supply Council established by the British in 1942, coordinating all scientific research and development carried out in the country in the service of the British and the Allies in general during the war.

Personal life 
In 1940, Farkas married Hannah Aharoni (Aharonovich), a Moscow native and trained microbiologist. He is the father of two daughters, Liora and Ruth. His parents and his little niece were murdered during the Holocaust.

On December 31, 1948, Farkas went on a mission to the United States to buy equipment for the Israeli university and army. The special flight, which takes off from Haifa, crashes at Monte Argentario in Tuscany. All the passengers and crew members, including Farkas, are killed. In Italy, a memorial service was held in their memory, and then Farkas was buried on the Har HaMenuchot cemetery in the Mount of Respites in Jerusalem.

His personal archives are kept at the National Library of Israel.

External links 
 Ladislaus Farkas, photos at the United States Holocaust Memorial Museum
 Dismissal letter to Ladislas Farkas by Fritz Haber

References 

Hungarian chemists
1904 births
1948 deaths
Max Planck Society alumni
TU Wien alumni
Hungarian physical chemists
People from Dunajská Streda
Academic staff of the Hebrew University of Jerusalem
Technical University of Berlin alumni